

The Inquirer Building, formerly called the Elverson Building, is an eighteen-story building at the intersection of North Broad and Callowhill Streets in the Logan Square neighborhood of Philadelphia, completed in 1924 as the new home for the newspaper  The Philadelphia Inquirer, which was joined by the Philadelphia Daily News in 1957. The original name refers to James Elverson, the publisher of the Inquirer from 1889 until his death in 1911.  His son, "Colonel" James Elverson Jr., took over as publisher, and had the building constructed and dedicated to his father. The building is the new headquarters of the Philadelphia Police Department, the 6th and 9th Police Districts, and the Medical Examiner's Office.

History and description

Construction
Construction began on the building in July 1923. It was designed in the Beaux-Arts style by Rankin, Kellogg & Crane, and was, at the time, the tallest building north of City Hall. Its gold dome, and the four-faced clock under it, could be seen for many miles.

Philadelphia Inquirer headquarters

The first issue of The Philadelphia Inquirer printed at the building was on July 13, 1925. The newspaper operation was considered at the time to have the most modern printing plant in the world, with the largest composing room and fastest printing presses.  The building also featured an auditorium and an assembly hall, and had its own refrigeration and water filtration plant.

The interior features a globe chandelier in the lobby, and a catwalk over the former press room. Elverson and his wife made their home on the building's 12th and 13th floors.

In 1996, the building was added to the National Register of Historic Places as the Elverson Building.

An extension to the building at 440 N. Broad Street, called the Rotogravure Building and designed by Albert Kahn Associates, was built in 1948 by Walter Annenberg, who was the owner of the newspapers at the time.  It was sold in 2005 by Knight-Ridder. In 2011 the extension was made the headquarters of the School District of Philadelphia.

Sale to Bart Blatstein and redevelopment

In late July 2011, it was announced that Philadelphia Media Network, which owned the newspapers and the building, was selling the  building to a developer for a price believed to be more than $19 million. That deal closed in October, and the next month the company announced that a downsized operation would move into the renovated former Strawbridge & Clothier store at 8th and Market Streets in the Market Street East area. The relocation to the building's third floor was completed by July 2012.

The developer who bought the Inquirer Building, Bart Blatstein, announced in May 2015 that he would attempt to turn the building into a 125-room boutique hotel. He applied for $5 million in funding from Pennsylvania to go towards the $36.4 million project.  According to Blatstein's schedule, construction would begin in August 2016.  Blatstein had originally planned on using the building as part of a hotel/casino complex. Blatstein said that he wanted to preserve the building and its historical features, although his previous casino plan, "The Provence", called for new construction in a "faux-French theme", which drew criticism as being "tacky". However, Blatstein failed to receive the necessary licensing from the Pennsylvania Gaming Control Board. 

In 2017 Blatstein abandoned plans to use the building as a hotel, opting instead to lease the building to the Philadelphia Police Department to serve as the new headquarters. The City plans to buy the building from Blatstein at the end of the lease.

See also

Media in Philadelphia
Architecture of Philadelphia

References

External links

Commercial buildings on the National Register of Historic Places in Philadelphia
Buildings and structures in Philadelphia
Office buildings completed in 1924
Beaux-Arts architecture in Pennsylvania